Erin Murphy (born March 13, 1960) is a Minnesota politician and member of the Minnesota Senate. A member of the Minnesota Democratic–Farmer–Labor Party (DFL), she represents District 64, which includes the Highland Park, Macalester-Groveland, Merriam Park, Summit Hill, and St. Anthony Park neighborhoods of the city of Saint Paul in Ramsey County in the Twin Cities metropolitan area. She is a former Majority Leader of the Minnesota House of Representatives, executive director of the Minnesota Nurses Association, and is also a registered nurse.

Education
Murphy graduated from high school in Janesville, Wisconsin, and attended the University of Wisconsin–Oshkosh, receiving her B.S. in nursing in 1984. She earned her M.A. in organizational leadership in health care at the College of St. Catherine in Saint Paul, Minnesota in 2005, and also attended the Humphrey Institute at the University of Minnesota from 2005 to 2006 as a policy fellow.

Career and community service
Murphy is a former executive director of the Minnesota Nurses Association and has also worked for the organization as a lobbyist and organizer. She worked in state government as legislative director for former Minnesota Attorney General Hubert H. Humphrey III, and as community relations director for the Minnesota Department of Children, Families and Learning. She was also an operating room nurse at the University of Minnesota Medical Center.

Murphy served on the board of directors of Citizens for a Safer Minnesota from 1999 to 2001, and as a member of the board of trustees of the American Nurses Association political action committee. She was also an executive board member of the Minnesota chapter of the AFL–CIO.

Minnesota House of Representatives

Murphy was first elected in 2006, and reelected in 2008, 2010, 2012, and 2014. She served on the Rules and Legislative Administration Committee, the Health Care and Human Services Policy and Oversight Committee, the Taxes Committee, the Finance Subcommittee for Health Care and Human Services Finance Division, and the Health Care and Human Services Policy and Oversight Subcommittee for the Licensing Division.

After the 2012 elections, Murphy was elected by the DFL House caucus to be Majority Leader.

2018 gubernatorial campaign

Murphy announced her candidacy for governor of Minnesota on November 17, 2016. She said her top priorities in office would be ensuring proper care for Minnesota's aging population, lessening the educational achievement gap, reducing racial disparities among Minnesotans, and bringing more jobs to Minnesota. Murphy supported a statewide single-payer healthcare system. She earned the endorsement of the Minnesota DFL at its annual convention in Rochester on June 2, 2018, after seven rounds of voting. Lori Swanson announced her candidacy after the convention, where she lost the endorsement for attorney general. U.S. Representative Tim Walz defeated Murphy and Swanson in the August 14 primary and was elected governor in November.

Minnesota State Senate 
In October 2019, Murphy announced she would launch a primary campaign against State Senator Dick Cohen. Murphy's House district covered the northern half of Cohen's Senate district. The next month, Cohen dropped out of the race.

Murphy was elected to the Minnesota Senate in 2020.

Murphy serves as the Ranking Minority Member on the Agriculture and Rural Development Finance and Policy Committee.

References

External links

 Murphy for Governor official campaign website
 Project Votesmart - Rep. Erin Murphy Profile

|-

1960 births
Living people
Politicians from Saint Paul, Minnesota
Democratic Party members of the Minnesota House of Representatives
Democratic Party Minnesota state senators
St. Catherine University alumni
University of Wisconsin–Oshkosh alumni
Humphrey School of Public Affairs alumni
Women state legislators in Minnesota
People from Columbus, Wisconsin
21st-century American politicians
21st-century American women politicians